David Jones (born September 19, 1985) is a former American football cornerback in the National Football League (NFL). He played college football for Wingate University and was selected in the fifth round of the 2007 NFL Draft by the New Orleans Saints.

Jones was also a member of the Cincinnati Bengals, Jacksonville Jaguars and Washington Redskins.

College career
Jones attended Wingate University, where he earned the name Jam Hands Jones. He is the first player ever from his college to be drafted to the NFL. He played between 2003 and 2006, where he made 15 interceptions and 110 tackles. He was a marketing major.

Professional career

New Orleans Saints
Jones was selected by the New Orleans Saints in the fifth round (145th overall) of the 2007 NFL Draft and played in all five of their preseason games, but was then cut by the Saints.

Cincinnati Bengals
Jones was claimed off of waivers by the Cincinnati Bengals on September 9, 2007.

Jacksonville Jaguars
Jones was traded to the Jacksonville Jaguars for safety Reggie Nelson and a conditional draft pick on September 4, 2010. It was later announced that the conditions for the draft pick were not met, so this was a one-for-one trade. Jones was released from the Jaguars on September 12, 2011. He was re-signed on December 3.

Washington Redskins
On July 24, 2012, Jones signed with the Washington Redskins. He was released on August 31, 2012, for final cuts before the start of the 2012 season. The Redskins re-signed him on September 25. After playing five games, he was waived again on November 6.

References

External links
 Washington Redskins bio
 Cincinnati Bengals bio

1985 births
Living people
American football cornerbacks
Cincinnati Bengals players
Jacksonville Jaguars players
New Orleans Saints players
Players of American football from South Carolina
Sportspeople from Greenville, South Carolina
Washington Redskins players
Wingate Bulldogs football players
Greenville Senior High School (Greenville, South Carolina) alumni